Syahrul Trisna Fadillah (born 26 November 1995) is an Indonesian professional footballer who plays as a goalkeeper for Liga 1 club Persikabo 1973 and the Indonesia national team.

Club career

PS TNI / Persikabo 1973
He was signed for PS TNI to play in Liga 1 in the 2018 season. Syahrul made his league debut on 26 March 2018 in a match against Persib Bandung at the Gelora Bandung Lautan Api Stadium, Bandung.

International career
In November 2021, Indonesian coach, Shin Tae-yong sent Syahrul his first call up to the full national side, for the friendly matches in Turkey against Afghanistan and Myanmar. In December 2021, he was named in Indonesian's squad for the 2020 AFF Championship in Singapore. On 9 December 2021, Syahrul earned his first cap, starting in a 2020 AFF Championship against Cambodia at Bishan Stadium, Bishan, Singapore. He stopped a penalty from Timor-Leste international Mouzinho in his second international senior team match in a 4–1 win against Timor-Leste on 27 January 2022. 

In September 2022, Syahrul was part of the starting eleven in a friendly match against Curaçao which resulted in a 2–1 win. In November 2022,  Syahrul received a call-up from the national team for a training camp, in preparation for the 2022 AFF Championship. On 2 January 2023, Syahrul substituted Nadeo Argawinata who got an injury at the 24th minute and made his second appearance at the AFF Championship.

Career statistics

Club

Notes

International appearances

Honours

Club
PS TNI U-21
 Indonesia Soccer Championship U-21: 2016

International
Indonesia
 AFF Championship runner-up: 2020

References

External links
 Syahrul Trisna at Soccerway
 Syahrul Trisna at Liga Indonesia

1995 births
Living people
Indonesian footballers
PSS Sleman players
Persikabo 1973 players
Liga 2 (Indonesia) players
Liga 1 (Indonesia) players
People from Sleman Regency
Sportspeople from Special Region of Yogyakarta
Association football goalkeepers
Indonesia international footballers